Thierry Coppens (born 2 November 1979) is a Belgian professional football goalkeeper. He currently plays for Ronse.

References
Guardian Football

1979 births
Living people
Belgian footballers
Association football goalkeepers
Royale Union Saint-Gilloise players
F.C.V. Dender E.H. players
S.V. Zulte Waregem players
Belgian Pro League players
Challenger Pro League players